Tony Hans-Joachim Martin (born 23 April 1985) is a German former professional road bicycle racer. Martin was known as a time trial specialist, and is a four-time world champion in the discipline – having won the title in 2011, 2012, 2013 and 2016 – which is joint-most with Fabian Cancellara. He also won a silver medal at the 2012 Summer Olympics in London, finishing runner-up to Bradley Wiggins in the event. Martin was also part of four world championship-winning team time trial squads, with /, in 2012, 2013 and 2016, and with Germany in the mixed relay time-trial in 2021.

Martin won seven Grand Tour stages, including five individual time trial stages – three at the Tour de France in 2011, 2013 and 2014, and two at the Vuelta a España in 2011 and in 2014. In the mid-part of his career Martin was a successful stage racer, winning the Eneco Tour (2010), Paris–Nice (2011) and the first two editions of the Tour of Beijing in 2011 and 2012.

Early life

Born in Cottbus, East Germany, Martin and the rest of his family escaped from East Germany shortly before the fall of the Berlin Wall and the collapse of communist Eastern Europe. Later, he returned to the Eastern part of Germany to attend sport school in Erfurt.

Career

Team High Road (2008–11)

2008
Having turned professional for the 2008 season, Martin took four victories during the year – he won the Hel van het Mergelland one-day race, as well as time trial stages at the Ster Elektrotoer, the Tour de l'Ain, and the Deutschland Tour. He also placed second to his teammate Marco Pinotti on the final time trial stage of the Giro d'Italia – his first start in a Grand Tour – and finished seventh in the time trial at the UCI Road World Championships.

2009

In 2009, Martin won time trials in the Critérium International, and the Bayern Rundfahrt. He also featured strongly in week-long stage races, winning the mountain classifications at Paris–Nice, and the Tour de Suisse, finishing second overall and winning a stage in the latter. Martin also made an impact at the Tour de France, wearing the white jersey as leader of the young rider classification for twelve days (between stages 3 and 14), and winning the combativity award after finishing second on Stage 20 at the top of Mont Ventoux. He took the bronze medal in the time trial at the UCI Road World Championships at the end of the season.

2010
Martin enjoyed more success in time trials in 2010, winning his first national championship title as well as stages in the Tour of California, and the Tour de Suisse. Martin finished second in the prologue and the Stage 19 individual time trial – behind Fabian Cancellara on both occasions – of the Tour de France, and again wore the white jersey as leader of the young rider classification on stages 1 to 3. Following the Tour de France, Martin finished first overall in the Eneco Tour, as well as the seventh stage time trial and the young rider classification. Martin again took the bronze medal at the time trial at the UCI Road World Championships.

2011

2011 saw Martin claim overall victories in the Volta ao Algarve, and Paris–Nice, having won time trials in both events. He also finished second overall in the Tour de Romandie, and won the time trial in the Critérium du Dauphiné. Martin won his first Grand Tour stage by taking victory in the Stage 20 individual time trial of the Tour de France. He also won the stage 10 time trial in the Vuelta a España. In September, Martin won the gold medal in the time trial at the UCI Road World Championships in Copenhagen, Denmark. He then won the opening time trial of the inaugural Tour of Beijing, and held the race lead for the rest of the event to claim overall victory.

Omega Pharma–Quick-Step (2012–16)

2012

Martin began 2012 with second overall in the Volta ao Algarve, finishing second to Bradley Wiggins by less than a second in the final time trial. In April, Martin lost consciousness after colliding with a car during training and sustained injuries, wrecking his early season. Martin returned to action at the Tour of Belgium in May, winning the time trial on Stage 4 and taking the overall victory.

At the Tour de France, Martin's hopes of winning the prologue, were dashed by a mechanical problem that forced him to switch bikes on course. Martin then crashed the following day on Stage 1, suffering a broken wrist. After suffering more mechanical problems in the next time trial, Stage 9, he withdrew from the competition so that his wrist would have more time to heal before the time trial at the Olympic Games three weeks later. Martin was deemed fit enough to compete, and he claimed silver at the Olympics behind Wiggins.

In September, Martin was part of the six-man  team that won the inaugural team time trial for trade teams at the UCI Road World Championships. Three days later, he successfully defended his individual world title, beating Taylor Phinney by five seconds and passing Alberto Contador on course. In October, Martin went back to China to attempt to defend his Tour of Beijing title at the last UCI World Tour race of the season. He placed well in all the stages, but his overall win was attributed in large part to a solo victory on stage 2. Martin attacked the lead group with  remaining, on the climb of the Dong Gang Hong Tunnel, and sped away to win by around 45 seconds to record his first road stage win since the 2009 Tour de Suisse.

2013

In February, Martin won the general classification of the Volta ao Algarve. He earned the leader's jersey on the fourth and last stage, a  individual time trial, which he won by over a minute from the next closest competitor, team-mate Michał Kwiatkowski. In the Tour de France he was involved in a crash on the 1st stage which left him with a concussion and a contusion on his left lung. He recovered enough to win stage 11, an individual time trial.

In the sixth stage of Vuelta a España, Martin managed a  solo breakaway, averaging , which was only caught in the final metres of the stage. Martin then went on to help his team  to narrowly beat  in the team time trial at the UCI Road World Championships. He then emerged victorious once more in the individual time trial, beating second placed Bradley Wiggins by 46 seconds, who was a further two seconds ahead of four-time winner Fabian Cancellara.

In the off season, Martin had surgery in Hamburg to resolve the scaphoid non-union resulting from his 2012 Tour de France stage 1 crash. The  team said he would wear a special cast for six weeks which would allow him to resume training before the cast was removed.

2014
On 1 June, he claimed his third consecutive Tour of Belgium and set a new record in doing so, surpassing 9 other riders who had managed to win the race two times. Martin then won the two time trials of the Tour de Suisse, finishing fourth overall after limiting his losses in the mountains. On 13 July, Martin won his first mass start road stage of the Tour de France. This time Martin won the stage and was able to begin his celebrations some distance before the line. He topped his Tour off by winning the 20th stage time trial by a margin of 1 minute 39 seconds over his nearest rival. He went on to take another Grand Tour stage win at the Vuelta a España, clinching the individual time trial on stage 10. However he missed out on victory in the time trials at the UCI Road World Championships, taking the bronze medal alongside his  teammates in the team event and the silver medal in the individual event, trailing Bradley Wiggins by 26 seconds.

2015

Martin had his first victory of the season in the individual time trial of the Volta ao Algarve. The second one came in May, at the Tour de Romandie, where he bettered Simon Špilak by eleven seconds in the rainy streets of Lausanne. At the end of June, he defended his German National Time Trial Championships title successfully.

At the Tour de France, Martin finished second behind Rohan Dennis in the opening time trial in Utrecht. Martin looked set to take the yellow jersey on Stage 2 when Dennis was dropped when the peloton split in crosswinds, but Fabian Cancellara outsprinted Martin's teammate Mark Cavendish to take third on the stage, and jump ahead of Martin into first place due to time bonuses. On Stage 3, Cancellara was involved in a large accident and lost time, but Martin again missed out on taking the yellow jersey, as Chris Froome came home second at the finish on the Mur de Huy, and took the lead by one second over Martin due to the time bonus. On 7 July, Martin won Stage 4 after a short escape  before the finish, taking the yellow jersey for the first time in his career. He was riding on a bike borrowed from teammate Matteo Trentin, having had mechanical problems earlier in the race, which featured  of cobbles. On Stage 6, Martin crashed in the final kilometre on an uphill section while he was still in yellow and had to abandon the Tour because of a broken collarbone.

One month later, Martin returned to racing; although he fell short in the individual time trial in stage 4, he gained time over his main competitors and eventually won the overall of the Tour du Poitou-Charentes, his first stage race win of the season.

2016

Martin spent two days in the leader's jersey at the Volta ao Algarve in February, having finished second on the third stage – an individual time trial – before losing the lead on the final day. He finished fourth overall at March's Three Days of De Panne, again finishing second on an individual time trial stage. He took his first victory of the season, with his fifth consecutive victory (and sixth overall) in the German National Time Trial Championships in June. He won the individual time trial at the Tour of Britain, and finished his season with gold medals in both the team time trial and the individual time trial at the UCI Road World Championships.

Team Katusha–Alpecin (2017–18)
In his first start with the team at the 2017 Volta a la Comunitat Valenciana, Martin took victory on the second stage with a  solo move. He finished on the overall podium at the 2017 Tour of Belgium in third place, before winning the German National Time Trial Championships for the seventh time. He finished eighth overall at the 2017 Tour of Britain, before finishing ninth in the time trial at the 2017 UCI Road World Championships – his worst placing in the event – having criticised the inclusion of an uphill finish on Fløyen. Martin's lone victory of the 2018 season came with a seventh consecutive win in the German National Time Trial Championships.

Team Jumbo–Visma (2019–21)
He formed part of winning team time trial stage efforts at the UAE Tour and the Tour de France, either side of another German National Time Trial Championships victory. He was later disqualified from the Tour de France following an incident with  rider Luke Rowe on stage 17, who was also disqualified from the race for his retaliation. At the UCI Road World Championships, Martin formed part of the German team that won a silver medal in the inaugural mixed team relay (consisting of three men and three women), which replaced the trade team time trial.

After Martin failed to record any top-ten finishes during the 2020 season, which was affected by the COVID-19 pandemic, he won the German National Time Trial Championships for its ninth consecutive edition in 2021, as the 2020 running was not held. At the Tour de France, Martin was involved in an incident with around  remaining on the opening stage; leading the peloton, Martin impacted a cardboard sign that was being held by a spectator at the side of the road, and was one of many riders to fall to the ground. Martin later abandoned the race after a further crash on the eleventh stage, which resulted in him ending up in a ditch. The spectator that caused the stage 1 crash was later fined €1200 for her actions, in court in Brest. In September, Martin announced that he would retire following the UCI Road World Championships, as an after effect of his Tour de France crashes and additional safety concerns. In his final race, he helped the German team win the mixed team relay, 13 seconds ahead of the Dutch team.

Personal life
Martin is the father of two daughters. In 2022, Martin auctioned off his Olympic silver medal to raise money for children during the Russian invasion of Ukraine. The winning bidder of the medal was a German supplements company, FitLine, who returned the medal to Martin.

Career achievements

Major results
Source:

2003
 1st  Time trial, National Junior Road Championships
 8th Time trial, UCI Junior Road World Championships
2004
 1st  Team pursuit, National Track Championships
2005
 Giro delle Regioni
1st Stages 4 & 6
 1st Stage 4 (ITT) Regio-Tour
 6th Time trial, UEC European Under-23 Road Championships
2006
 1st  Time trial, National Under-23 Road Championships
 1st  Overall Thüringen Rundfahrt der U23
 3rd Overall Mainfranken-Tour
 6th Road race, UEC European Under-23 Road Championships
2007
 1st  Overall FBD Insurance Rás
1st Young rider classification
 1st Coppa Città di Asti
 2nd Overall Thüringen Rundfahrt der U23
1st Stage 1
 2nd Overall Tour de l'Avenir
 7th Overall Circuit des Ardennes
1st Stage 3 (ITT)
2008
 1st Hel van het Mergelland
 1st Stage 3b (ITT) Tour de l'Ain
 1st Stage 8 (ITT) Deutschland Tour
 1st Prologue Ster Elektrotoer
 3rd Time trial, National Road Championships
 3rd Overall Sachsen Tour
 7th Time trial, UCI Road World Championships
2009
 1st  Mountains classification, Paris–Nice
 1st Stage 3 (ITT) Critérium International
 1st Stage 4 (ITT) Bayern Rundfahrt
 2nd Time trial, National Road Championships
 2nd Overall Tour de Suisse
1st  Mountains classification
1st Stage 8
 3rd  Time trial, UCI Road World Championships
 7th Overall Volta ao Algarve
 7th Clásica de Almería
 8th Overall Tour de Romandie
1st Stage 3 (TTT)
 Tour de France
Held  after Stages 3–14
 Combativity award Stage 20
2010
 1st  Time trial, National Road Championships
 1st  Overall Eneco Tour
1st  Young rider classification
1st Stage 7 (ITT)
 1st Stage 7 (ITT) Tour of California
 3rd  Time trial, UCI Road World Championships
 6th Overall Tour de Suisse
1st Stage 9 (ITT)
 Tour de France
Held  after Stages 1–3
2011
 1st  Time trial, UCI Road World Championships
 1st  Overall Paris–Nice
1st Stage 6 (ITT)
 1st  Overall Volta ao Algarve
1st Stage 5 (ITT)
 1st  Overall Tour of Beijing
1st Stage 1 (ITT)
 1st Chrono des Nations
 1st Stage 6 (ITT) Tour of the Basque Country
 1st Stage 20 (ITT) Tour de France
 1st Stage 10 (ITT) Vuelta a España
 1st Stage 3 (ITT) Critérium du Dauphiné
 2nd Time trial, National Road Championships
 2nd Overall Tour de Romandie
 5th UCI World Tour
 5th Trofeo Deià
2012
 UCI Road World Championships
1st  Time trial
1st  Team time trial
 1st  Time trial, National Road Championships
 1st  Overall Tour of Belgium
1st Stage 4 (ITT)
 1st  Overall Tour of Beijing
1st Stage 2
 1st Chrono des Nations
 2nd  Time trial, Olympic Games
 2nd Overall Volta ao Algarve
 4th Eschborn–Frankfurt – Rund um den Finanzplatz
 5th Overall Tour of the Basque Country
2013
 UCI Road World Championships
1st  Time trial
1st  Team time trial
 1st  Time trial, National Road Championships
 1st  Overall Volta ao Algarve
1st Stage 4 (ITT)
 1st  Overall Tour of Belgium
1st Stage 3 (ITT)
 1st Chrono des Nations
 Tirreno–Adriatico
1st Stages 1 (TTT) & 7 (ITT)
 1st Stage 6 (ITT) Tour of the Basque Country
 1st Stage 5 (ITT) Tour de Romandie
 1st Stage 4 (ITT) Critérium du Dauphiné
 1st Stage 11 (ITT) Tour de France
 6th Overall Tour of Beijing
 8th Trofeo Serra de Tramuntana
  Combativity award Stage 6 Vuelta a España
2014
 1st  Time trial, National Road Championships
 1st  Overall Tour of Belgium
1st Stage 3 (ITT)
 Tour de France
1st Stages 9 & 20 (ITT)
Held  after Stage 9
 Combativity award Stages 9 & 10
 Vuelta a España
1st Stage 10 (ITT)
 Combativity award Stage 10
 Tour of the Basque Country
1st Stages 2 & 6 (ITT)
 1st Stage 1 (TTT) Tirreno–Adriatico
 UCI Road World Championships
2nd  Time trial
3rd  Team time trial
 4th Overall Dubai Tour
 4th Overall Tour de Suisse
1st Stages 1 (ITT) & 7 (ITT)
2015
 1st  Time trial, National Road Championships
 1st  Overall Tour du Poitou-Charentes
 Tour de France
1st Stage 4
Held  after Stages 4–6
 1st Stage 3 (ITT) Volta ao Algarve
 1st Stage 6 (ITT) Tour de Romandie
 UCI Road World Championships
2nd  Team time trial
7th Time trial
2016
 UCI Road World Championships
1st  Time trial
1st  Team time trial
 1st  Time trial, National Road Championships
 1st Stage 7a (ITT) Tour of Britain
 4th Overall Three Days of De Panne
  Combativity award Stage 16 Tour de France
2017
 1st  Time trial, National Road Championships
 1st Stage 2 Volta a la Comunitat Valenciana
 3rd Overall Tour of Belgium
 8th Overall Tour of Britain
 9th Time trial, UCI Road World Championships
2018
 1st  Time trial, National Road Championships
 7th Time trial, UCI Road World Championships
2019
 1st  Time trial, National Road Championships
 1st Stage 2 (TTT) Tour de France
 1st Stage 1 (TTT) UAE Tour
 UCI Road World Championships
2nd  Mixed team relay
9th Time trial
2021
 UCI Road World Championships
1st  Mixed team relay
6th Time trial
 1st  Time trial, National Road Championships

Grand Tour general classification results timeline

Major championships timeline

Awards
 German Male Cyclist of the Year: 2009, 2011, 2016
 Thüringia Sportsperson of the Year: 2012

Notes

References

External links

1985 births
Living people
Sportspeople from Cottbus
German male cyclists
Tour de Suisse stage winners
German Tour de France stage winners
German Vuelta a España stage winners
UCI Road World Champions (elite men)
Cyclists at the 2012 Summer Olympics
Cyclists at the 2016 Summer Olympics
Olympic cyclists of Germany
Olympic silver medalists for Germany
Olympic medalists in cycling
Medalists at the 2012 Summer Olympics
2013 Tour de France stage winners
2014 Tour de France stage winners
2011 Tour de France stage winners
2014 Vuelta a España stage winners
Rás Tailteann winners
Cyclists from Brandenburg